James Frazier may refer to:
 James B. Frazier (1856–1937), American politician, U.S. Senator, Governor of Tennessee
 James B. Frazier Jr. (1890–1978), American politician, U.S. Representative
 James Frazier (conductor), American orchestral conductor
 J. J. Frazier, American basketball player

See also
 James Fraser (disambiguation)
 James Frazer (disambiguation)
 Jim Frazier (disambiguation)